Óscar López Hernández (born 11 May 1980) is a Spanish retired footballer. A defender, he played in all the back-four positions (mainly left back). He is now managing the FC Barcelona Juvenil B team.

His professional career, started with Barcelona, was marred by injuries.

Club career
Born in Cerdanyola del Vallès, Barcelona, Catalonia, López was a product of the FC Barcelona cantera. He appeared for the club's C and B-sides, being given his senior debut by Radomir Antić in a 3–1 win over Recreativo de Huelva on 25 May 2003 and adding a further seven appearances over the course of that and the following seasons. His first taste of European football came on 15 October 2003, in an 8–0 rout of FK Matador Púchov in the UEFA Cup.

However, López failed to establish himself in the main squad, and was subsequently loaned to S.S. Lazio for 2004–05. He made 14 Serie A appearances, played twice in the Italian Cup and three times in the UEFA Cup, but struggled to earn a regular starting position, and the Rome club decided against buying the player at the end of the campaign.

López returned to Spain in 2005 and went on loan to Real Betis, making his debut against Barcelona in a 2–1 win for the second leg of the Spanish Supercup. He managed to be relatively used during the season, with 25 official matches – appearing in two European competitions – and, after that, was bought in a four-year deal.

In January 2007, López began a six-month loan stint with La Liga strugglers Gimnàstic de Tarragona, where he sustained a serious knee injury which would have him unregistered for almost a year, although the move was extended for 2007–08. Upon his return to Andalusia in July 2008, he was told to look for a new team; unable to do so, he spent the following year training with the club, although not registered at all.

On 4 February 2010, being completely ostracized at Betis, López was finally released, and joined Segunda División's CD Numancia. He scored his first goal ever as a professional on 16 May in a 1–1 home draw against Rayo Vallecano, as the Sorians eventually failed to return to the top tier; in June 2011, aged 31, he was released.

On 23 December 2011, Dutch Eerste Divisie club Go Ahead Eagles announced the signing of López, who signed until June 2012 with an option for an extra year.

References

External links
 

1980 births
Living people
People from Vallès Occidental
Sportspeople from the Province of Barcelona
Spanish footballers
Footballers from Catalonia
Association football defenders
La Liga players
Segunda División players
Segunda División B players
Tercera División players
FC Barcelona C players
FC Barcelona Atlètic players
FC Barcelona players
Real Betis players
Gimnàstic de Tarragona footballers
CD Numancia players
Serie A players
S.S. Lazio players
Eerste Divisie players
Go Ahead Eagles players
Spanish expatriate footballers
Expatriate footballers in Italy
Expatriate footballers in the Netherlands
Spanish expatriate sportspeople in Italy
Spanish expatriate sportspeople in the Netherlands